Platz der Republik (Republic Square) is a square in Berlin, Germany. It is located in the Tiergarten (borough Mitte), directly in front (west) of the Reichstag building. The square has an area of about 36,900 square meters and is almost completely covered by grass but is decorated with some hedges and a few trees.

Before 1926 and between 1933 and 1948 it was called Königsplatz (King's Square). The Victory Column stood here before it was moved to its present location in 1939.

History 

The square was created in about 1735 and was used under King Frederick William I as parade-ground, a sandy field then known as "Exerzierplatz vor dem Brandenburger Tor". In 1844 the Kroll Opera House was built on its west end, and in 1867 it was turned into a city square named "Königsplatz". 

In 1873 the Victory Column was erected in the center of the square, at the end of the newly created Siegesallee boulevard. At the east end of the square stood the Palais of the Polish-Prussian count Atanazy Raczyński, before the Reichstag building was built there from 1884 to 1894.

During the Weimar Republic, the square was named "Platz der Republik" to commemorate the abolition of the monarchy. When the Nazis took power in 1933, the square was renamed "Königsplatz". As part of a grandiose plan to create a "Welthauptstadt Germania", the Victory Column was enlarged and moved to its present location in 1939. World War II ended in 1945 and in 1948 the square returned to the name "Platz der Republik". The Kroll Opera, severely damaged in the war, was finally demolished in 1951. 

The Berlin Wall ran past the back side of the Reichstag. The square, now a large lawn, was thus far away from traffic and was used as a recreational area for weekend barbecues etc. After German reunification in 1990 the square regained its position of central importance in Berlin. A large German flag was raised on the square in the night from 2 to 3 October 1990.

In 1991 the German Bundestag decided that Berlin would again be the seat of government and parliament. The renovation of the Reichstag building was completed in 1999.

Events 

In the fall of 1948, the square saw a huge demonstration protesting against the Berlin blockade. About 300,000 people participated, and mayor Ernst Reuter gave a haunting speech.

A number of concerts had taken place at the Platz der Republik in the late 1980s, including in 1987 David Bowie as part of the Glass Spider Tour, Eurythmics as part of the Revenge Tour and Genesis as part of the Invisible Touch Tour and latterly in 1988 Pink Floyd as part of the A Momentary Lapse of Reason Tour and Michael Jackson as part of the Bad World Tour.      

On 22 July 2005 an ultralight aircraft crashed on the square, killing the pilot. The police later determined that it was a likely suicide.

Leading up to the 2006 FIFA World Cup, in April 2006 the sports company Adidas began to asphalt the square in order to erect the "Adidas World of Football", a miniature version of the Olympiastadion Berlin with about 8,000 seats. It was used to show live coverage of the football games. After the event, Adidas restored the square to its prior condition; this included finding trees all over Germany that matched the trees that had to be removed.

Sources 

 Hans-Werner Klünner: Berliner Plätze. Fotografien von Max Missmann. Nicolaische Verlagsbuchhandlung Beuermann GmbH, Berlin 1996, S. 76–79.
 Heinz Ohff, Rainer Höynck (Hrsg.): Das BerlinBuch. Stapp-Verlag, Berlin 1987, .
 Wolfgang Ribbe, Jürgen Schmädicke: Kleine Berlin-Geschichte. 3. erweiterte und aktualisierte Auflage. Stapp-Verlag, Berlin 1994, .

References

External links 
 360°-panorama of the square and adjacent buildings

History of Berlin
Squares in Berlin
Mitte